Oh What a Feeling is the third studio album by American R&B, soul and gospel singer Mavis Staples. It was released on July 16, 1979, by Warner Bros. Records.

Critical reception
A review published by Billboard in the July 28, 1979 issue said, "Well known vocalist from the Staple Singers steps out on her second solo effort with a mixture of uptempo, disco flavored songs and midtempo, soulful ballads. Staples voice is fluid, strong and gutsy, giving this LP much the same appeal which highlighted Cheryl Lynn's exhilarating debut last year. Also contributing to this album's success is the instrumentation which is provided by the Muscle Shoals Horns, guitarists Mark Knopfler, Pele Can and others. Best cuts "Let Love Come Between Us", "Oh What a Feeling", "Loving You", "Tonight I Feel Like Dancing", and "I've Been to the Well Before"."

Cashbox published a review of the album in the issue dated July 28, 1979, which said, "Mavis gave the Staple Singers that distinct, gritty vocal sound, and on Oh What a Feeling she proves just how versatile she is. She soars through a mixed bag of styles on the LP - disco, gospel, straight ahead R&B and gospel - and performs them all in flawless fashion. A torchy ballad, "I Miss You", the disco hit, "Tonight I Feel Like Dancing", and the R&B flavored title cut are the LP's highpoints."

Track listing

Personnel
Adapted from the album liner notes.

 Harrison Calloway - horn arrangements
 Cynthia Douglas - background vocals
 Donna Davis - background vocals
 Pamela Vincent - background vocals
 David Hood - bass
 Jesse Boyce - bass
 Roger Hawkins - drums
 Gregg Hamm - engineer
 Joe Barbaria - engineer
 Bill Fair - assistant engineer 
 Bruce Bachhalter - assistant engineer 
 David Yates - assistant engineer 
 Bobby Hata - mastering
 Stuart J. Romaine - mastering
 Steve Melton - remix engineer ("Tonight I Feel Like Dancing")
 Jimmy Johnson - guitar
 Larry Byrom - guitar
 Mark Knopfler - guitar
 Mose Dillard - guitar
 Pete Carr - guitar
 Muscle Shoals Horns - horns
 Barry Beckett - producer, keyboards, synthesizers
 George Schiffer - management
 Joe Thompson - management
 Chris Koelle - make-up
 Tom Roady - percussion
 Sherman Weisburd - photography
 Jerry Wexler - producer
 Paul Wexler - supervisor
 Jerry Simpson - remix supervisor ("Tonight I Feel Like Dancing")

References

1979 albums
Mavis Staples albums
Albums produced by Jerry Wexler
Albums produced by Barry Beckett
Albums recorded at Muscle Shoals Sound Studio
Warner Records albums